Kerbera is a species of plants in the Apocynaceae first described as a genus in 1885. It contains only one known species, Kerbera eichleri, endemic to the State of Rio de Janeiro in Brazil.

References

Flora of Brazil
Asclepiadoideae
Monotypic Apocynaceae genera